Shahadat Hossain Liton is a Bangladeshi film director and story writer. He has been directed more than 50 films.

Career
Shahadat Hossain Liton started his career with the movie Rabi Mastan.

Filmography

See also
 Uttam Akash
 SA Haque Alik

References

External links
 

Bangladeshi directors
Bangladeshi film directors
Bangladeshi film producers
Living people
Year of birth missing (living people)